U.S. Route 169 (US-169) is a major north–south U.S. Highway that runs from US-64 in Tulsa, Oklahoma, to US-53 near Virginia, Minnesota. In Kansas, the highway is a main north–south route that runs through the eastern end of the state from the Oklahoma border to Missouri border. Along the way US-169 intersects several major highways including US-400 by Cherryvale, US-54 by Iola, overlaps US-59 south of Garnett, overlaps I-35 from Olathe to Merriam, and in Kansas City begins an overlap with I-70, US-24 and US-40 which it follows into Missouri.

Route description

US-169 enters the state at Coffeyville as a four-lane road and is a four-lane highway for about  until the edge of the Coffeyville Industrial Park. A segment between Chanute and Iola is a freeway with fully controlled access with center concrete barrier, with two lanes in each direction. At Osawatomie the road becomes a full freeway and runs concurrently with K-7. In southern Johnson County US-169 becomes an expressway until its junction with Interstate 35 (I-35) in Olathe.

From this point to the Missouri state line, US-169 alternates between freeways and surface streets. It follows I-35 to Shawnee Mission Parkway in Overland Park, then travels east to Rainbow Boulevard.  US-169 then follows surface streets to its junction with I-70 near downtown Kansas City. US-169 and I-70 enter Missouri together just after crossing the Kansas River.

History

In a June 30, 1980 resolution, US-169 and K-57 were realigned to run directly north–south through Iola. Also at this time, K-269 was first designated a state highway and ran from K-57 and US-169 north to US-54. In a September 20, 1991, resolution, it was proposed to realign K-57 and US-169 over K-269. The project was completed on October 31, 1999, and at that time, K-269 was decommissioned and became part of the new K-57 and US-169.

The intersection immediately south of Garnett used to be a braided intersection with stop and yield signs; it was identified as a high crash location in 2001, and was rebuilt as a roundabout that opened in April 2006. The Kansas Department of Transportation is rebuilding or planning to rebuild several other rural intersections as roundabouts for increased safety.

Major intersections

Garnett business route

U.S. 169 has one special route while in  Kansas, Business Route 169. The business route northern terminus is the junction of U.S. 169 & 6th Avenue in Garnett. The main highway bypasses the town to the Southeast. The business route travels along 6th Avenue until reaching Maple Street where it intersects with U.S. 59 and K-31 until it ends at its intersection with U.S. 169 at a roundabout South of Garnett in Anderson County, Kansas.

References

 Kansas
U.S. Highways in Kansas

External links

Kansas Department of Transportation State Map
KDOT: Historic State Maps